Shebaya (Shebaye, Shebayo) is an extinct Arawakan language of Trinidad and perhaps the Venezuelan coast. It is only attested by a few words. Aikhenvald (1999) classifies it with the Ta-Arawakan (Caribbean Arawakan) languages.

References

Arawakan languages
Indigenous languages of the Caribbean
Languages of Trinidad and Tobago